Nerita exuvia, common name the "snakeskin nerite",  is a medium-sized species of sea snail, a marine gastropod mollusc in the family Neritidae, the nerites.

Distribution

References

External links 

 SeaLifeBase info
 Images of shells of this species from Linnaeus' own collection

Neritidae
Gastropods described in 1758
Taxa named by Carl Linnaeus
Taxobox binomials not recognized by IUCN